Cryptosporangium is a genus of bacteria in the phylum Actinomycetota.

Etymology
The name Cryptosporangium derives from:Gr . adj . kruptos, hidden; New Latin noun sporangium [from Greek noun spora (σπορά), a seed (and in biology a spore), and Greek noun angeion (Latin transliteration angium), vessel], sporangium; New Latin neuter gender noun Cryptosporangium, an organism with sporangia (spore containing vessels) covered or hidden by mycelium.

Species
Cryptosporangium comprises the following species:
 C. arvum Tamura et al. 1998 (Latin noun arvum, arable field, cultivated land, pertaining to isolate from arable land.)
 C. aurantiacum (ex Ruan et al. 1976) Tamura and Hatano 2001 (New Latin neuter gender adjective aurantiacum, orange-coloured.)
 C. cibodasense Nurkanto et al. 2015
 C. eucalypti Himaman et al. 2017
 C. japonicum Tamura et al. 1998 (New Latin neuter gender adjective japonicum, pertaining to Japan where the organisms were isolated.)
 C. minutisporangium (Ruan et al. 1986) Tamura and Hatano 2001 (Latin adjective minutus, little, small, minute; New Latin noun sporangium [from Greek noun spora (σπορά), a seed (and in biology a spore), and Greek noun angeion (Latin transliteration angium), vessel], sporangium; New Latin noun minutisporangium (nominative in apposition), the small sporangium.)
 C. mongoliense Ara et al. 2012
 C. phraense Suriyachadkun et al. 2020

See also
 Bacterial taxonomy
 Microbiology

References 

Bacteria genera
Actinomycetia